Kentucky Route 272 (KY 272) is a  state highway in the U.S. state of Kentucky. The highway connects rural areas of Trigg and Christian counties with Hopkinsville.

Route description

Trigg County
KY 272 begins at an intersection with US 68/KY 80 (Canton Road) southwest of Cadiz, within Trigg County. It travels to the east and immediately intersects the northern terminus of KY 1062 (Maple Grove Road). It crosses over Caney Creek and curves to the southeast before curving to the northeast. It intersects the southern terminus of KY 1175 (Old Dover Road). The highway intersects KY 139 (S Road) and then crosses over Burge Creek. It begins curving to the southeast and crosses over Little River. KY 272 heads to the southeast and intersects the northern terminus of KY 1253 (Hardy Road). It curves to the east-southeast and intersects KY 1585 (Caledonia Pee Dee Road/Montgomery Road). It crosses over Boyd Lake Branch and travels through Caledonia. The highway heads to the northeast and enters Christian County.

Christian County
KY 272 crosses over Interstate 24 (I-24) and curves to the east-southeast to an intersection with KY 117 (Gracey Herndon Road) in Julien. It heads to the east-northeast and intersects the eastern terminus of KY 164 (Newstead Road). The highway crosses over Riverside Creek and intersects US 68 Byp. (Eagle Way). A short distance later, it enters Hopkinsville. It crosses over the North Fork Little River. It intersects the western terminus of KY 380 (Country Club Lane). It then intersects the southern terminus of KY 1007 (North Drive). KY 272 curves to the northeast and passes Jennie Stuart Medical Center. It curves to the southeast and meets its eastern terminus, an intersection with KY 107 (South Virginia Street/South Main Street) on one-way pairs.

Major intersections

See also

References

0272
Transportation in Estill County, Kentucky
Transportation in Powell County, Kentucky